Jacob Söderqvist (born 4 May 1976) is a Swedish snowboarder. He competed in the men's halfpipe event at the 1998 Winter Olympics.

References

External links
 

1976 births
Living people
Swedish male snowboarders
Olympic snowboarders of Sweden
Snowboarders at the 1998 Winter Olympics
People from Falun
Sportspeople from Dalarna County
20th-century Swedish people